Northwest Orient Airlines Flight 705 was a scheduled passenger flight operated on February 12, 1963, that broke up in midair and crashed into the Florida Everglades shortly after takeoff from Miami International Airport in a severe thunderstorm. The plane was destined for Portland, Oregon, via Chicago, Spokane, and Seattle.

Aircraft 
N724US, was a Boeing 720B manufactured July 14, 1961. Since then it had accumulated 4,684 flight hours. It was powered by four Pratt & Whitney JT3D-1 engines.

Crew 
Captain Roy W. Almquist, aged 47, had accumulated 17,385 flight hours, 150 of which were on the Boeing 720. He had type ratings in the DC-3, DC-4, DC-6, DC-7, Lockheed L-188 Electra and the Boeing 720.<ref name="Report"

First officer Robert J. Feller, aged 38, had accumulated 11,799 flight hours, 1,093 of which were on the Boeing 720. He had type ratings in the DC-4, DC-6, DC-7 and the Boeing 720.<ref name="Report"

Second Officer Allen R. Friesen, aged 29, had accumulated 4,853 flight hours, 523 of which were on the Boeing 720.<ref name="Report"

Accident 
Prior to departing from Miami in the early afternoon, the Northwest Orient flight crew questioned the ground controller at the airport about the departure routes being used, and the controller replied that most flights were departing "either through a southwest climb or a southeast climb and then back over the top of it."

After the Boeing 720 lifted off from Runway 27L, helmed by captain Roy Almquist, it made a left turn, based on radar vectors from Miami Departure Control, to avoid areas of anticipated turbulence associated with thunderstorm activity. Another flight had followed the same guidance shortly before the jet took off.

While maintaining  and a heading of 300 degrees, Flight 705 contacted controllers and requested clearance to climb to a higher altitude. After a discussion between the flight and the radar departure controller about the storm activity, and while clearance to climb was being coordinated with the Miami Air Route Traffic Control Center, the flight advised "Ah-h we're in the clear now. We can see it out ahead ... looks pretty bad."

At 13:43 EST, Flight 705 was cleared to climb to flight level 250. They responded, "OK ahhh, we'll make a left turn about thirty degrees here and climb..." The controller asked if 270 degrees was their selected climb-out heading, and they replied that this would take them "... out in the open again..." Controllers granted the jet clearance accordingly. Following some discussion about the severity of the turbulence, which was described as moderate to heavy, the flight advised, "OK, you better run the rest of them off the other way then."

At 13:45, control of Flight 705 was transferred to Miami Air Route Traffic Control Center. There were communication difficulties, although after the jet was provided with a different frequency to use, the flight crew established contact with Miami ARTCC. Several minutes after contact was established, the jet entered a severe updraft. The jet initially reacted with a nose-down maneuver, to which the pilots probably reacted with a pitch-up. Following this input, the rate of climb decreased through zero when the altitude peaked momentarily at just above . As the peak altitude was approached, the vertical accelerations changed rapidly from 1G to about -2G.

In the next seven seconds, the negative acceleration continued to increase at a slower rate, with several fluctuations, to a mean value of about -2.8G, and the jet began diving toward the ground with increasing rapidity, exceeding the 90° angle. As the descent continued, the acceleration trace went from the high negative peak to 1.5G, as the pilot tried to pull the plane out of the dive, pulling on the control column and applying trim.

Below , the forward fuselage broke up as a result of the forces of the dive. The main failures in both wings and horizontal stabilizers were in a downward direction, and virtually symmetrical. The forward fuselage broke upward and the vertical stabilizer failed to the left.

Investigation

Upset
The force required to move the elevators downward topped at 10°, and as the angle increased, the force required lowered. The negative Gs caused by the pitchdown would have lifted the pilots from their seats, blurring their vision and making them unable to hold the yoke, which was in the full forward position due to the increased sensitivity. Due to this it was next to impossible to start recovering before reaching 320 knots (the maximum airspeed for recovery).

Probable cause
The final report on the crash determined the cause of the accident to be:<ref name="Report"

References

External links
Flight Safety Network - Accident description
National Transportation Safety Board brief

Aviation accidents and incidents in 1963
1963 in Florida
Airliner accidents and incidents in Florida
Airliner accidents and incidents caused by in-flight structural failure
History of Monroe County, Florida
705
February 1963 events in the United States
Accidents and incidents involving the Boeing 707